Bennie Muller (born 14 August 1938) is a Dutch former professional footballer who played as a midfielder for Ajax and the Netherlands national team.

Early life
Muller was born in the Jewish Quarter of Amsterdam-East. His grandfather was a fruit seller named Levi Sluiter. His mother was incarcerated in Westerbork transit camp during World War 2. Approximately 200 members of Muller's extended family were killed in the Holocaust.

Career
Muller played club football for Ajax beginning in 1958, and was its captain.

He also appeared for the Netherlands national team on 43 occasions, and was its captain.

Personal life

Muller is Jewish, and was one of only five Jewish players to have played for Ajax – the others being Eddy Hamel, Johnny Roeg, Sjaak Swart, and Daniël de Ridder.

Muller married on 27 September 1961. He has a daughter, Petra, and a son Danny, who is also a professional footballer. Muller later owned a cigar shop near Amsterdam Centraal station.

See also
List of Jewish footballers

References

1938 births
Living people
Dutch footballers
Dutch people of Jewish descent
Netherlands international footballers
Jewish Dutch sportspeople
Jewish footballers
AFC Ajax players
Eredivisie players
Footballers from Amsterdam
Association football midfielders